A go apprentice  is a student learning to play Go at an institution, typically with the aim of becoming a professional player. In Japan, such a student is called an insei (literally, "institution student"). Institutions for insei include the Nihon Ki-in (Japanese Go Association) and the Kansai Ki-in (Kansai Go Association). The equivalent of Go insei in Korea is "Yeon gu saeng", read "Ken kyū sei" in Japanese and "Yán jiū shēng" (also meaning "graduate student") in Chinese.

Qualifications and study 
In Japan, once a year 3 or 4 apprentices who qualify in a yearly tournament become professional players.  

East Asian players are required to become a professional before the age of 18 while studying as insei, but foreigners have the chance up to the age of about 30.

To become an insei, a person requires a professional to sponsor them, and an application to the Nihon Ki-in.  There is no official way to contact a professional for sponsorship.

While insei, many people live with their professional sponsor, who tutors and supports them. Some insei just visit their professional sponsor several times a week. The professional sponsor acts as a mentor for the insei.

External links
 Nihon Ki-in
 Insei in Japan
 Korean-style Insei League online

apprentice